A bathroom bill is the common name for legislation or a statute that denies access to public toilets by gender or transgender identity. Bathroom bills affect access to sex-segregated public facilities for an individual based on a determination of their sex as defined in some specific way, such as their sex as assigned at birth, their sex as listed on their birth certificate, or the sex that corresponds to their gender identity. A bathroom bill can either be inclusive or exclusive of transgender individuals, depending on the aforementioned definition of their sex. Unisex public toilets are one option to avoid this controversy.

Proponents of the bills argue that such legislation is necessary to maintain privacy, protect what they claim to be an innate sense of modesty held by most cisgender people, prevent voyeurism, assault, molestation, and rape, and retain psychological comfort. Critics of the bills argue that they do not make public restrooms any safer for cisgender (non-transgender) people, and that they make public restrooms less safe for both transgender people and gender non-conforming cisgender people. Additionally, critics claim there have been no cases of a transgender person attacking a cisgender person in a public restroom, although there has been at least one isolated incident of voyeurism in a fitting room. The American Medical Association, the American Psychological Association, and the American Academy of Pediatrics are all opposed to bathroom bills.

One bathroom bill, the Public Facilities Privacy & Security Act in North Carolina, was approved as a law in 2016, although portions of the measure were later repealed in 2017 as part of a compromise between the Democratic governor and Republican-controlled Legislature. Also in 2016, guidance was issued by the U.S. Departments of Justice and Education stating that schools which receive federal money must treat a student's gender identity as their sex (for example, in regard to bathrooms). This policy was revoked in 2017.

United States

Each of the states in the U.S. is a sovereign with the ability to make its own laws, which are secondary to federal law under the doctrine of federalism as carved out in the Constitution. To pass federal (national) laws, the government has to justify that the topic affects some national interest as defined in that document. For example, the law may apply only to federal property. Alternatively, a law may apply to state property, but it might be argued to affect a federal interest. Moreover, each state may delegate powers to its local governments. Thus, there are federal, state and local laws that govern toilets and other intimate spaces. Additionally, federal or state agencies may be authorized to issue regulations to further clarify laws, but they are only valid if they are consistent with the overarching legislation under which they were issued. Building laws (including regulations) in some states require that toilets be physically separated for both sexes, making unisex toilets virtually illegal. Unisex toilets have been increasingly put into operation in universities and large cities, although most of these institutions also offer the alternative of sex-separated spaces.

Examples
In a landmark 2013 case, the Colorado Civil Rights Division ruled in favor of six-year-old transgender student Coy Mathis to use the girls' bathroom at her elementary school. It was the first ruling of its kind in the United States and one of the first high-profile transgender rights cases, garnering huge amounts of media attention.

In May 2016, the United States Department of Justice and the United States Department of Education released a joint guidance on the application of Title IX protections to transgender students. The guidance stated that for the purpose of Title IX, the Department of Justice and the Department of Education treat a student's gender identity as their sex. The guidance was followed by a formal "Dear Colleague" letter on May 13.

In October 2016, the U.S. Supreme Court agreed to take up the case of Gavin Grimm, a transgender male student who was barred from using the boys' bathrooms at his high school in Gloucester County, Virginia. The U.S. Court of Appeals for the 4th Circuit had previously ruled that Grimm could use these restrooms, but the Supreme Court stayed that decision in August.

In February 2016, the city of Charlotte, North Carolina, adopted an ordinance which, it said, was intended to allow transgender persons a right to access bathrooms according to gender identity. The preexisting ordinance, in § 12-58 prohibited discrimination race, religion or national origin. In addition, the preexisting ordinance in § 12-59 banned discrimination based on sex but specifically exempted bathrooms, changing rooms and other intimate spaces from sex discrimination prohibitions, thus allowing separation based on sex. The ordinance did not ban discrimination based on gender identity or sexual orientation. By the February 2016 amendment, the City Council added gender, gender identity, sexual orientation and marital status to the protected categories. It also deleted this provision that allowed separation based on "sex". In so doing, it essentially eliminated the word "sex" from the city ordinance, leaving the term gender. The North Carolina legislature reacted by passing the Public Facilities Privacy & Security Act (HB2). In addition to making other changes, the bill defined the issue of bathroom access as one of statewide concern, defined sex as biological. It required that all bathrooms be separated by biological sex. It did allow for business owners to apply for a waiver to make single-entry bathrooms all-gender/mixed-sex. Afterward, advocacy groups, celebrities, and businesses joined together in a boycott of the state. Later, in a "compromise", the legislature agreed to repeal HB2, but it also barred localities from making any changes regarding bathrooms until 2020.

Shortly after HB2 was passed, in May 2016, in the last year of President Obama's presidency, the U.S. Justice Department sued North Carolina over its 'bathroom bill' in order to stop its implementation. Moreover, advocates claim that businesses in North Carolina have enforced toilet restrictions on transgender customers at their discretion. Mississippi also limited public toilet usage through the enactment of a law that protects religious beliefs, citing: "male (man) or female (woman) refers to an individual’s immutable biological sex as objectively determined by anatomy and genetics at time of birth", which does not consider transgender and intersex people. Later, the Justice Department under Trump withdrew its opposition to this and similar state laws and policies.

State legislatures in Arizona, Illinois, Kansas, Kentucky, Massachusetts, Minnesota, Mississippi, Missouri, South Carolina, Tennessee, and Texas have proposed bills that would restrict public toilet access to access on the basis of sex as biologically defined. Some of these laws allow the establishment of single stall separate toilets that can be used by all genders/both sexes. The National Center for Transgender Equality, an LGBTQ advocacy group, calls these bills discriminatory.

Public perception
Public opinion regarding "transgender bathroom rights" in the United States is mixed:

Reception

Proponents of bathroom bills argue that such legislation is necessary to maintain privacy, protect what they claim to be an innate sense of modesty held by most cisgender people, prevent voyeurism, assault, molestation, and rape, and retain psychological comfort.

Critics of bathroom bills have argued that they place transgender people in danger without making cisgender people any safer and that they even make things more dangerous for gender non-conforming cisgender people. Many national health and anti-sexual assault organizations oppose bathroom bills, such as the American Medical Association, American Psychological Association, and the American Academy of Pediatrics. The UCLA's Williams Institute has tracked prevalence of crimes in bathrooms since the passage of various protections for the transgender population and has found that there has been no significant change in the number of crimes. Marcie Bianco, writing for Mic, pointed out that there is not a single documented case of a transgender person attacking a cisgender person in a public restroom, although there has been at least one isolated incident of voyeurism in a fitting room. The controversy has been labeled a moral panic by Pacific Standard, and Dan Savage went so far as to call it an "anti-trans blood libel".

According to the largest U.S. survey of transgender people ever undertaken, carried out by the National Center for Transgender Equality (NCTE) in 2015 with 27,715 respondents, 1% of respondents reported being sexually assaulted in a public restroom for being transgender. 12% reported being verbally harassed in a public restroom, and another one percent reported being non-sexually physically assaulted for being transgender. 9% reported being denied the right to use a public restroom consistent with their expressed gender. The NCTE acknowledges in its report that this survey was undertaken before any bathroom bills had been passed or were in the news. Multiple studies find that denying trans people to the bathroom that they identify with is associated with poor mental health, suicide, and suicide attempts.

A 2018 study in the Journal of the American Academy of Psychiatry and the Law finds that "there is no current evidence that granting transgender individuals access to gender-corresponding restrooms results in an increase in sexual offenses".

Education
In 2016, the U.S. Department of Justice and U.S. Department of Education, under President Barack Obama issued "guidance" to state and private educational institutions stating that these institutions had to allow transgender students to use toilets according to their gender identity. The Obama guidance suggested that schools and private institutions risked federal funding if they did not comply.

How the guidance was issued was controversial. Guidance procedures are normally issued only to other federal agencies. These guidances are then sometimes shared with state entities and private institutions as advisory, but they are normally not compulsive. While agencies can issue regulations that are consistent with existing law, they cannot exceed or change the law. Moreover, those regulations must comply with the U.S. Administrative Procedure Act (APA). The APA requires notice to the public and a period for comments. Opponents argued that using the joint guidance was inappropriate and was designed to circumvent the APA. The Department of Justice, the Department of Education, advocacy groups and private litigants brought cases to enforce the joint guidance interpretation.

One of those cases, G.G. v. Gloucester School Board, reached the Supreme Court in 2016. On February 22, 2017, about a month after Trump's inauguration, the government withdrew the May 13 guidance. In withdrawing the guidance, then Attorney General Jeff Sessions stated in a letter, "The prior guidance documents did not contain sufficient legal analysis or explain how the interpretation was consistent with the language of Title IX.  ... Congress, state legislatures, and local governments are in a position to adopt appropriate policies or laws addressing this issue." On March 6, 2017, the Supreme Court determined that, in light of the changed position of the government, the case, should be vacated and the case remanded for further consideration in the lower courts.

Employment
The Equal Employment Opportunity Commission (EEOC) is a key U.S. agency that enforces federal workplace rules. States also have their own rules but in a conflict, if constitutional, federal law is supreme. A key statute is Title VII. Title VII, passed as part of the Civil Rights Act of 1964, prohibits discrimination in the workplace "because of" race, color, religion, sex, or national origin. Title VII does not mention sexual orientation or gender identity.

Although few dispute that Congress was thinking about gender identity or sexual orientation in 1964, advocates have argued that sexual orientation and gender identity are included in the law's reference to "sex".  In 2012, the EEOC adopted this view. It ruled in Macy v. Holder, a case involving federal employees, that Title VII required that "gender identity" be treated the same as "sex". It also ruled soon thereafter that a transgender person had to be afforded access to a public toilet matching the person's gender identity without a requirement of surgery or status identification. These decisions departed from then existing legal precedent as well as the EEOC's own long line of precedents.  The EEOC began to bring and support lawsuits across the country to enforce its interpretation. Citing the EEOC's holding, several courts later followed the EEOC's interpretation, although some rejected it.

Currently, in the United States, the highest court, the Supreme Court, has the opportunity to consider several cases raising the issue of whether sex and gender should be considered the same in a federal employment statutes or under the Constitution. A case that directly involves the rights of transgender persons is R.G. & G.R. Harris Funeral Homes Inc. v. Equal Employment Opportunity Commission (No. 18-107) (Sup. Ct. 2018). The case involves a transgender woman who was employed with a funeral home. The funeral home required its employees to wear uniforms and assigned those uniforms based on biological sex. After transitioning, the employee stated her desire to wear the uniform designated for females. The funeral home's owner indicated that the arrangement was not acceptable given stated religious views and the religious concerns of customers using the funeral home's services. When the parties could not reach agreement, the employer fired her. After receiving a complaint, the EEOC sued the funeral home on behalf of the employee.  If the Supreme Court agrees with the EEOC's position, that sexual orientation discrimination and gender identity discrimination are de facto discrimination on the basis of "sex" under the language of Title VII, that ruling would likely ensure access to toilets in the workplace by virtue of gender identity and self-identification. A finding against that position would likely leave the question of access to local authorities.

Although it had previously deferred consideration of the rights of LGBTQ persons under U.S. federal statutes (other than in the context of marriage), on April 22, 2019, the Supreme Court accepted (i.e., "granted certiorari" in) the RG & GR Funeral Homes v. EEOC case as well as two other Title VII cases: (1) Bostock v. Clayton County, and (2) Altitude Express, Inc. v Zarda. This acceptance means that the Court will hear argument in these cases in its new term that starts in October 2019.

One has seen reversals of Obama-era policies at the federal level with respect to other statutes such as Title IX which prohibits denials of educational opportunity based on sex. In May 2016 the U.S. Department of Education and the Justice Department under the Obama Administration indicated that single-sex schools and schools receiving federal money must treat transgender students consistent with their gender identity under Title IX of the Education Amendments of 1972. That guidance was later withdrawn by the Department of Justice under President Trump.

Currently in the U.S., each state, county, and city government enacts its own legislation governing how it will or will not address the rights of LGBT individuals; this includes provision of public toilets.

State legislation
Bathroom bills have been proposed and debated in a number of state legislatures.  Several state bills are based on and closely resemble model legislation provided by the conservative lobbying organization Alliance Defending Freedom (ADF), which has been classified by the Southern Poverty Law Center as an anti-LGBT "hate group". The ADF's model legislation proposes giving any public school or university student the right to sue for $2,500 for each time they encountered a transgender classmate in a locker room or bathroom.

Table

The following table summarizes state legislation and school guidelines regarding restroom access that either is currently in effect, or is still under deliberation with movement within the last year:

Alaska
Anchorage, Alaska, prohibited discrimination based on gender identity in 2015. In 2017, Alaska Family Action proposed a direct initiative bathroom bill that would have overturned protections for transgender individuals. Proposition 1 would have made it legal for "any employer, public accommodation, or other person to establish and enforce sex-specific standards or policies concerning access to intimate facilities such as locker rooms, showers, changing rooms, and restrooms." The measure defines the term sex as "An individual's immutable biological condition of being male or female, as objectively determined by anatomy and genetics at the time of birth." Voters rejected the bill in April 2018.

Alabama
SB1, also known as the "Alabama Privacy Act", was introduced in Alabama on February 7, 2017, by state Senator Phil Williams in response to an inclusive bathroom policy enacted by Target Corporation in 2016. The bill, if passed, would require attendants to be present in mixed-gender public bathrooms "to monitor the appropriate use of the rest room and answer any questions or concerns posed by users." The bill stalled and was never brought to a vote.

HB 322 was introduced on February 9, 2022. The bill's primary sponsor was Scott Stadthagen and "requires public K-12 schools to designate use of rooms where students may be in various stages of undress on the basis of biological sex". The bill passed on April 7, 2022 and was signed into law by Alabama Governor Kay Ivey on April 8, 2022

Arizona
A 2013 proposed amendment to Arizona bill S.B. 1432 would have allowed police to demand identification from anyone suspected of using the 'wrong' public bathrooms or showers, meaning the facilities assigned to the sex not matching the sex on their birth certificate. If found guilty, a person would have been subject to up to six months in jail and a $2500 fine under a disorderly conduct charge. The proposal was withdrawn by its sponsor, John Kavanagh.

Kavanagh introduced S.B. 1040 on January 31, 2023 which requires public schools to provide separate accommodations to a person who is "unwilling or unable" to use a bathroom which matches their "immutable biological sex as determined by anatomy and genetics at the time of the person's birth." Additionally, a student who encounters a person of the opposite sex in a restroom may have a cause of action against the school and may sue to "recover monetary damages for all psychological, emotional and physical harm suffered."

Arkansas
HB1156 was introduced by Rep. Mary Bentley on January 17, 2023. It requires public schools to provide reasonable accommodation for an individual who is "unwilling or unable" to use a bathroom designated for the individual's sex, where sex is defined as "the physical condition of being male or female based on genetics and physiology". A public school may be sued if a student encounters a member of the opposite sex in the bathroom who received permission to be there from the school, and fines may be assessed for superintendents, principals, and/or individual teachers by the Professional Licensure Standards Board. The House approved the bill on an 80-10 vote on February 1, 2023.

SB270 was introduced by lead sponsor John Payton and primary sponsor Cindy Crawford on February 15, 2023 to amend the criminal offense of sexual indecency with a child to include a person "exposing his or her sex organs to a minor of the opposite sex" in a bathroom, or entering a bathroom "that is assigned to persons of the opposite sex while knowing a minor of the opposite sex is present". The penalty for violating this law includes up to a year in jail and up to a $2,500 fine.

After being pulled back to committee on March 2, 2023 as the result of a speech by Sen. Clarke Tucker, the bill was revised, resubmitted, and passed the senate on March 7, waiting for house deliberation on March 9.

California

AB 1266, also known as the "School Success and Opportunity Act", was introduced by Assemblyman Tom Ammiano on February 22, 2013. It requires that pupils be permitted to participate in sex-segregated school programs, activities, and use facilities consistent with their gender identity, without respect to the gender listed in a pupil's records. AB 1266 was approved by Governor Brown on August 12, 2013. A campaign to overturn AB1266 led by Frank Schubert failed to garner enough signatures to appear on a ballot the following year.

On Sept 19, 2014 Governor Brown vetoed 2 potty parity bills, SB1350 and SB1358 introduced by senators Ricardo Lara and Lois Wolk. These bills would have required changing stations in public bathrooms to be accessible to both men and women. Brown cited too many regulations as a rationale for his vetos.

AB 1732, also known as the "Equal Restroom Access Act", was authored by Assembly Member Phil Ting and signed into law by Governor Jerry Brown on September 29, 2016 after approval by the Assembly and Senate. The law made California the first state in the US to require all single-occupancy public toilets to be gender-neutral beginning March 1, 2017. This includes California schools, government buildings, businesses and public toilets. Legislation has also been proposed in California that "requires...private buildings open to the public, as specified, to maintain at least one safe, sanitary, and convenient baby diaper changing station that is accessible to women and men". Since California passed AB 1732, states like New York, Vermont, New Mexico, the District of Columbia and several other jurisdictions have followed suit.

SB 760 was introduced by State Sen. Josh Newman (politician) on February 17, 2023. The law requires all K-12 schools to provide access to gender-neutral bathrooms during school hours.

Colorado
In Colorado, in February 2015, a bill died in committee that proposed banning transgender people from using changing rooms of their gender identity. This bill would have prevented discrimination lawsuits against facility managers who chose to deny entry into facilities to transgender people.

Florida
A bathroom bill was introduced in Florida in the spring of 2015 as H.B. 583 by Representative Frank Artiles. Artiles complained that, under laws protecting transgender use of restrooms, "A man such as myself can walk into the bathroom at LA Fitness while women are taking showers, changing, and simply walk in there." His bill would have made it illegal for transgender people to use bathrooms corresponding to their gender identity in restaurants, workplaces, or schools. The consequences would be up to a year in jail and a $1,000 fine. Proponents claimed that the bill was designed to prevent "assault, battery, molestation, rape, voyeurism, and exhibitionism". Opponents claimed that the only purpose was to be "discriminatory" and to "criminalize [transgender people] for simply going about their daily lives".  The bill went through two House committees, but did not pass. There were no further bathroom bills filed in the Florida state legislature in 2015 or 2016, but organizations like Equality Florida said in 2017 that they were preparing for the possibility of future bills.

Indiana
In January 2021, Indiana State Senator Bruce Borders introduced a Bill to the Senate that would make it a Class-B Misdemeanor for any person to use a bathroom or locker-room that did not correlate with their birth sex.

Kansas
In 2016, the Kansas legislature introduced a "bathroom bill" that was nearly identical to the ADF's model "bathroom bill" legislation.  The bill died after public protests over the legislation's provision allowing students to sue their school if they encountered a transgender person in a bathroom or locker room.

Kentucky
A 2015 proposal in Kentucky, also based on the ADF model legislation, would have allowed students to sue their school if they encountered transgender students using the bathroom corresponding to the gender with which they identify. It would have allowed transgender students instead to request special accommodations, including access to single-stall or faculty restrooms. On February 27, 2015, the bill S.B. 76 passed in the Kentucky Senate, but it did not pass the Kentucky House.

Massachusetts
Massachusetts prohibited discrimination in sex-segregated facilities based on gender identity in 2016. It includes a provision prohibiting assertion of a gender identity for an "improper purpose", which was meant to address the criticism that a man could insincerely claim to be a transgender woman in order to gain access to a bathroom for the purpose of looking at women inside (though assault, harassment, and "peeping Tom" offenses are also crimes which can be charged separately from merely being present). Voters were asked whether to repeal this law when Question 3 appeared on the ballot on November 6, 2018. This was the first time such a question was put to voters at the state level.  The law was upheld by approximately 1.76 million votes for and 834,000 votes against. A study of Massachusetts cities that enacted a similar ban in the two years before the statewide ban took effect found no impact on the rate bathroom crimes, which were rare to begin with.

Minnesota
A bathroom bill was introduced in Minnesota in 2016. It was a word-for-word copy of the ADF's model legislation.

Mississippi 
House bill 1258 was introduced in 2016, but did not make any progress. It would have charged any person who "lewdly and willfully exposed his person, or private parts thereof" with a misdemeanor. Notably, an exception was explicitly made for transgender people who had taken HRT for a period of at least 12 months, requiring such persons to be able to provide written proof from a doctor.

Missouri
Two bathroom bills were introduced in Missouri in 2017.

Nevada
On March 19, 2015, Victoria Dooling, a Nevada state representative, proposed a bathroom bill that would apply to public schoolchildren in the state. It later died in committee.

New Mexico
In March 2019, a bill passed both houses of the New Mexico Legislature (House vote 54-12 and Senate vote 23-15) to explicitly allow gender-neutral bathrooms. The bill was signed into law by the Governor within the same month and went into effect on July 1, 2019.

New York
On March 7, 2016, Mayor Bill de Blasio signed an Executive Order requiring that all New York City municipalities make available to the public and their employees a single-sex facility consistent with their gender identities. Individuals using these facilities would not need to show any identification or medical documentation to verify their gender.

The New York State Legislature, in July 2020, passed a bill to implement gender-neutral bathrooms within all single occupancy public toilets across the state.

North Carolina

On March 23, 2016, North Carolina Governor Pat McCrory (R) signed into law the Public Facilities Privacy & Security Act (commonly known as House Bill 2). The law states that in government buildings, individuals (such as students at state-operated schools) may only use restrooms and changing facilities that correspond to the sex identified on their birth certificates. Transgender persons born in North Carolina can obtain modified birth certificates on which their sex is different from what was originally identified at the time of their birth, but only if they have undergone sex reassignment surgery. For those born in other places, the ability to change the sex listed on a birth certificate is governed by their place of birth (which may have substantially different requirements, and in some cases may not allow such changes).

The bill also overturns an LGBT anti-discrimination ordinance that had been passed by Charlotte, North Carolina, prevents local governments in the state from enacting similar ordinances, and prevents cities from raising their minimum wages higher than that of the state.

On August 26, 2016, a U.S. District Court judge granted a preliminary injunction, preventing the University of North Carolina from enforcing the restroom provisions of the bill.

On March 30, 2017, the legislature partially repealed House Bill 2, removing the restrictions on restroom use by transgender individuals. The compromise agreement was criticized by both LGBT rights groups and conservatives.

Oklahoma
On May 25, 2022, Oklahoma Governor Kevin Stitt signed a bill into law that will require students at public charter schools and public schools to use locker rooms and bathrooms that match the sex listed on their birth certificate.

South Carolina
In April 2016, Sen. Lee Bright brought a bill (S. 1203) to the South Carolina Senate, that was essentially the same as North Carolina's HB2.  The bill would block local governments from passing anti-discriminatory ordinances such as the use of public bathrooms by gay, lesbian, bisexual, and transgender individuals. Senator Bright's bill would maintain that public bathrooms be used in accordance to "biological sex". An online poll taken from a news site stated that 75% of voters did not think the bill was necessary. The legislation failed to meet the crossover deadline for bills to pass from one legislative chamber to the other.

In December 2016, a similar bill was introduced by Representative Steven Wayne Long in the South Carolina house (H. 3012).

South Dakota

On February 16, 2016, the South Dakota Senate voted 20–15 to approve a bathroom bill that, had it passed, would have been the first in the country to require public schoolchildren to use facilities that match the sex they were assigned at birth. South Dakota's bill was, according to ADF's legal counsel, based on the ADF's model bathroom bill legislation. On March 1, 2016, the governor of South Dakota, Dennis Daugaard, vetoed the bill. Early in the 2017 legislative session Republican Senator Lance Russell refiled the bathroom bill, but on January 30 he withdrew the bill because Daugaard again promised a veto.

Tennessee
On April 6, 2016, the Tennessee House Education Administration and Planning Committee, which is part of the Tennessee House of Representatives, approved a bathroom bill that would apply to public schools and colleges in the state and would require students to use a restroom that corresponds with their sex as identified at birth. Before the bill could proceed further, the house sponsor of the bill decided to delay its consideration for a year to allow for further investigation, citing concerns that it could interfere with Title IX funding. In 2017, the bill was re-introduced, but died in the Senate Education Committee.

In 2019, Tennessee governor Bill Lee signed into law legislation that modified the definition of indecent exposure to include acts committed in restrooms and locker rooms if they are designated for use by a single sex and the person committing the act is of the opposite sex (as assigned at birth).  The original version of this legislation would have criminalized the mere act of a transgender individual entering a restroom opposite to their sex as assigned at birth, but this provision was eventually removed.  Nevertheless, critics of the legislation were still concerned that the bill would be interpreted as condoning harassment of transgender individuals in bathrooms by others who find their presence objectionable.

Texas

A bill introduced to the Texas House of Representatives in March 2015 proposed that any student who encountered another student who does not identify with their "biological sex" in a shared restroom could be awarded $2,000 in damage reparations for "mental anguish". The school itself would also be liable for failing to take action against known transgender students using their gender identified restroom. An analysis by NBC News determined that the Texas bill was influenced by ADF's model legislation, which also proposes $2,500 in damages per encounter with a transgender person in a shared restroom.

Another bill, introduced to the Texas House in February 2015, suggested that anyone over the age of 13 years found to be in a public restroom of a gender not their own should be charged with a Class A misdemeanor, spend up to a year in jail, and face a $4000 fine. Under this proposed bill, building managers who repeatedly and knowingly allow transgender individuals to use the facility of their gender identity would also face a fine of up to $10,000.

Several bills were filed in both the regular legislative session and first special session of the Texas Legislature in 2017. Sponsored by State Senator Lois Kolkhorst and championed by Lieutenant Governor Dan Patrick, the Texas Senate passed SB6 in the regular session and SB3 in the Special Session by a vote of 21-10 largely along party lines (Senator Eddie Lucio Jr. was the only Democrat to vote in favor of each bill). Neither bill went to the House floor for a vote (although SB6 received a hearing by the House's State Affairs committee). SB6 would have limited bathroom access based on the sex listed on one's birth certificate while SB3 would have allowed an individual to use the restroom listed on several state IDs as well (e.g. driver's license or concealed carry license).

Speaker of the Texas House Joe Straus voiced his opposition to the bills, citing the economic impact that North Carolina saw while HB2 was law. He was also quoted by a New Yorker article as saying, "I'm disgusted by all this. Tell the lieutenant governor I don't want the suicide of a single Texan on my hands."

In September 2018, Kolkhorst indicated that she would try again to pass similar legislation.

Vermont
On May 11, 2018, Vermont Governor Phil Scott signed a bill requiring all single-user public restrooms to be gender-neutral.

Virginia
In 2016, Delegate Mark Cole sponsored House Bill 663, a bathroom bill restricting public restroom use according to a person's "anatomical sex", defined as "the physical condition of being male or female, which is determined by a person's anatomy", with violators liable for a civil penalty not to exceed $50. HB663 was introduced on January 11, 2016, and died in committee in February 2016. It was widely reported that HB663 would require adults to inspect the genitals of children before they were allowed to enter the appropriate facilities, but this was dismissed by Snopes as a misleading interpretation of the bill's text, which states that administrators "shall develop and implement policies that require every restroom ... that is designated for use by a specific gender to solely be used by individuals whose anatomical sex matches such gender designation." Cole sponsored House Bill 781 one day later on January 12, 2016, which used the same wording but substituted "biological sex" for "anatomical sex". The use of "biological sex" allowed for an update via amended birth certificate. HB781 also died in committee in February.

In early 2017, HB1612, proposed by Republican Bob Marshall would use the "born sex" to define which restroom, changing facility, or private area in government buildings was permitted for a given individual. HB1612 also stated that individuals that did not use the bathroom of their born sex would be subject to civil action. Additionally, HB1612 required school principals to inform the parents of a child if the child did not wish to identify as their born sex. The bill was killed in subcommittee on January 19, 2017.

Washington
In early 2015, SB 6548, which would prevent transgender individuals from using the bathroom associated with the gender with which they identify, was introduced in the senate but failed to pass. In December 2015, Washington State's Human Rights Commission enacted a rule that allowed transgender individuals to use bathrooms conforming with their gender identities. Early in 2016, a bill to overturn the ruling (SB 6443) was voted on in the state Senate, and defeated by a margin of 25–24. An attempt to put a state voter initiative on the November 2016 ballot, I-1515, failed to reach the number of signatures necessary to appear on the ballot. On December 5, 2016, a new bill, HB 1011, was pre-filed in the Washington State House. This bill would prevent transgender individuals from using a bathroom of their gender identity unless they have had sex-reassignment surgery, and would prevent local municipalities from enacting ordinances contradicting the directive.

Wisconsin
In November 2015, Wisconsin held a hearing on a bathroom bill to require public schoolchildren to use facilities that match the sex they were assigned at birth. According to critics, the bill would also violate the federal government's Office for Civil Rights's 2014 statement that federal nondiscrimination law covered gender identity. The following month, the bill was revised to allow public schools to offer gender-neutral bathrooms.

Canada 
In Canada, several bills tried to include gender identity and gender expression among the characteristics protected from discrimination and eligible for consideration in sentencing hate criminals.

In 2009, New Democratic Party (NDP) MP Bill Siksay introduced Bill C-389 to the 40th Parliament. It passed the House of Commons in 2011 and was defeated in the Senate.

Bill C-279, introduced to the 41st Parliament in 2011 by NDP MP Randall Garrison, was passed and sent to the Senate in March 2013. In 2015, Senator Don Plett introduced three amendments, one of which exempted public washrooms and changerooms from protection. It was defeated. Garrison reintroduced it to the 42nd Parliament as Bill C-204.

Bill C-16 was introduced on May 17, 2016, by Minister of Justice Jody Wilson-Raybould to the 42nd Parliament. It passed both houses and became law upon receiving royal assent on June 19, 2017, effective immediately.

See also

 Florida Senate Bill 254 (2023)
 Moral panic
 Unisex public toilet
 Workers' right to access the toilet
 Transgender rights in the United States

References

Transphobia
LGBT law in the United States
LGBT law in Canada
Sex segregation
Transgender law